Robert Sylvester Farrell Jr. (October 25, 1906 – October 28, 1947) was an American Republican politician in the state of Oregon.

Political career
He lived in Portland, Multnomah County, Oregon, and served as a Delegate to the Republican National Convention from Oregon in both 1940 and 1944. Farrell was elected as the Speaker of the Oregon House of Representatives in 1941. He served as Oregon Secretary of State from 1943 until his death in 1947.

Death
He died in office while flying to southern Oregon on a hunting trip, with Oregon Governor Earl Snell, State Senate President Marshall E. Cornett and pilot Cliff Hogue. All four were killed when the small plane crashed in stormy weather near Dog Lake, Lake County, Oregon, on October 28, 1947. His interment was at River View Cemetery in Portland, Oregon.

References

Speakers of the Oregon House of Representatives
Republican Party members of the Oregon House of Representatives
Secretaries of State of Oregon
1906 births
1947 deaths
Politicians from Portland, Oregon
Burials at River View Cemetery (Portland, Oregon)
Victims of aviation accidents or incidents in the United States
Accidental deaths in Oregon
20th-century American politicians
Victims of aviation accidents or incidents in 1947